The Mercedes-Benz X-Class (W470) is a luxury pickup truck that was sold by the German automaker Mercedes-Benz, a division of German multinational company Daimler AG. Unveiled at a world premiere in Cape Town, South Africa in July 2017, the pickup took its chassis from the Nissan Navara and employed many Mercedes-specific features and technologies, including some engines not shared with the Navara. It first went on sale in late 2017.

Development 

In 2015, Mercedes-Benz announced that development of a pickup truck was in the works. The new vehicle, developed in conjunction with the Renault-Nissan-Mitsubishi Alliance, was to be assembled at Nissan and Renault plants in Europe and South America.

On 25 October 2016, Mercedes-Benz announced a concept class called the X-Class Concept. Dieter Zetsche, Daimler Chairman and head of Mercedes-Benz cars, said it would help a growing segment. It was slated to be only available in Australia, New Zealand, Europe, Latin America, and Africa. The top-of-the-range engine is a turbocharged diesel V6 paired with a 4Matic permanent all-wheel-drive system.

Production started in 2017 at the Nissan factory in Spain. Plans to produce the pickup at the Renault plant in Santa Isabel, Argentina were cancelled due to alleged contractual disputes between executives from both marques.

According to Mercedes, the X-Class would be the world's first true "premium" pick-up truck, followed by the failed Lincoln Blackwood and Lincoln Mark LT, two upmarket versions of the Ford F-150, along with the also-failed Cadillac Escalade EXT, an upmarket version of the Chevrolet Avalanche that turns out to be a short-bed version of the Chevrolet Tahoe/Suburban, and in other words, a pickup variant of the full-size luxury SUV. Of these, the X-Class only managed to last longer on the market than the Lincoln Blackwood.

Global sales of the X-Class in 2018, its first full year on the market, were just 16,700 in Europe, Australia and South Africa. It further decreased to around 15,300 in 2019, with 2,186 sold in Australia alone. Production ot the X-Class was halted in May 2020 due to slow sales. The slow sales are primarily attributed to a negative perception of the vehicle's platform. It was argued that many customers expected an entirely new vehicle designed and built by Mercedes and were underwhelmed when it was instead presented as a joint-venture with Nissan/Renault. This issue was further compounded with the use of Nissan/Renault engines in lower end trim levels. Despite the X350 sharing the same V6 diesel engine platform as the G-Class and other Mercedes models, public perception was that the X-Class was an expensive rebrand of a Nissan Navara, an image it struggled to shake throughout its short production run.

Promotion 
On 19 July 2017, the promotional video/advertising spot "Mercedes-Benz X-Class: Pickup Meets Lifestyle – Trailer" was released, with "We Are Young" song by Blues Saraceno as soundtrack.

Models 
The X-class launched with three trim levels: Pure, Progressive and Power.

Engines

References

External links 

X-Class
Off-road vehicles
All-wheel-drive vehicles
Pickup trucks
Cars introduced in 2017
Rear-wheel-drive vehicles
2020s cars